Caecidotea is a genus of crustacean in the family Asellidae. It contains the following species:

Caecidotea acuticarpa Mackin & Hubricht, 1940
Caecidotea adenta (Mackin & Hubricht, 1940)
Caecidotea alabamensis (Stafford, 1911)
Caecidotea ancyla (Fleming, 1972)
Caecidotea antricola Creaser, 1931
Caecidotea attenuata (Richardson, 1900)
Caecidotea barri (Steeves, 1965)
Caecidotea beattyi Lewis & Bowman, 1981
Caecidotea bicrenata (Steeves, 1963)
Caecidotea bilineata Lewis & Bowman, 1996
Caecidotea bowmani Lewis, 1980
Caecidotea brevicauda (Forbes, 1876)
Caecidotea cannula (Steeves, 1963)
Caecidotea carolinensis Lewis & Bowman, 1977
Caecidotea catachaetus (Fleming & Steeves, 1972)
Caecidotea chiapas Bowman, 1975
Caecidotea circulus (Steeves & Holsinger, 1968)
Caecidotea communis (Say, 1818)
Caecidotea cumberlandensis Lewis, 2000
Caecidotea cyrtorhynchus (Fleming & Steeves, 1972)
Caecidotea dauphina Modlin, 1986
Caecidotea dentadactyla (Mackin & Hubricht, 1938)
Caecidotea dimorpha (Mackin & Hubricht, 1940)
Caecidotea extensolinguala (Fleming, 1972)
Caecidotea filicispeluncae Bowman & Hobbs, 1983
Caecidotea fonticulus Lewis, 1983
Caecidotea forbesi (Williams, 1970)
Caecidotea foxi (Fleming, 1972)
Caecidotea franzi (Holsinger & Steeves, 1971)
Caecidotea fustis Lewis, 1981
Caecidotea henroti (Bresson, 1955)
Caecidotea hobbsi (Maloney, 1939)
Caecidotea holsingeri (Steeves, 1963)
Caecidotea holti (Fleming, 1972)
Caecidotea incurva Steeves & Holsinger, 1968
Caecidotea insula (Julian Lewis, 2017)
Caecidotea intermedia (Forbes, 1876)
Caecidotea jordani (Eberly, 1966)
Caecidotea kendeighi (Steeves & Seidenberg, 1971)
Caecidotea kenki (Bowman, 1967)
Caecidotea laticaudata (Williams, 1970)
Caecidotea lesliei Lewis & Bowman, 1981
Caecidotea mackini Lewis, Graening, Fenolio & Bergey, 2006
Caecidotea macropropoda Chase & Blair, 1937
Caecidotea metcalfi (Fleming, 1972)
Caecidotea mitchelli Argano, 1977
Caecidotea montana (Mackin & Hubricht, 1938)
Caecidotea nickajackensis Packard, 1881
Caecidotea nodula (Williams, 1970)
Caecidotea nortoni (Steeves, 1966)
Caecidotea obtusa (Williams, 1970)
Caecidotea occidentalis (Williams, 1970)
Caecidotea oculata Mackin & Hubricht, 1940
Caecidotea packardi Mackin & Hubricht, 1940
Caecidotea pasquinii (Argano, 1972)
Caecidotea paurotrigona (Fleming, 1972)
Caecidotea phreatica Lewis & Holsinger, 1985
Caecidotea pricei Levi, 1949
Caecidotea puebla (Cole & Minckley, 1968)
Caecidotea racovitzai (Williams, 1970)
Caecidotea recurvata (Steeves, 1963)
Caecidotea reddelli (Steeves, 1968)
Caecidotea richardsonae Hay, 1901
Caecidotea rotunda Bowman & Lewis, 1984
Caecidotea salemensis Lewis, 1981
Caecidotea scrupulosa (Williams, 1970)
Caecidotea scypha (Steeves & Holsinger, 1968)
Caecidotea sequoiae Bowman, 1975
Caecidotea serrata (Fleming, 1972)
Caecidotea simonini (Bresson, 1955)
Caecidotea simulator Lewis, 1999
Caecidotea sinuncus (Steeves, 1965)
Caecidotea spatulata Mackin & Hubricht, 1940
Caecidotea steevesi (Fleming, 1972)
Caecidotea stiladactyla Mackin & Hubricht, 1940
Caecidotea stygia Packard, 1871
Caecidotea teresae Lewis, 1982
Caecidotea tomalensis (Harford, 1877)
Caecidotea tridentata Hungerford, 1922
Caecidotea vandeli (Bresson, 1955)
Caecidotea vomeri Argano, 1977
Caecidotea williamsi Escobar-Briones & Alcocer, 2002
Caecidotea zullini Argano, 1977

References

Asellota
Taxa named by Alpheus Spring Packard
Taxonomy articles created by Polbot